The Trois Burettes Inn was situated at the crossroads of Namur high road and the Old Roman Road, in Belgium. It was a notable location in two battles:
Battle of Fleurus (1690): Duc de Luxembourg, commanding Louis XIV of a French army soundly defeated Prince Waldeck’s Allied force of comprising mainly Dutch, German, and Spanish troops. In this battle the right wing of the French army crossed two bridges near the Trois-Burettes.
Battle of Ligny (1815): The French Army of the North under Napoleon Bonaparte defeated a Prussian army under the command of Prince Blücher. At the start of the battle the cross roads was occupied by the Prussian 5th Brigade (Greneral Tippelskirch's). When the 5th Brigade advanced on Saint-Amand-la-Haye the 7th Brigade (General Brause's) occupy the position.

Notes

References

 

Hotels in Belgium
Battle of Ligny locations